The 2021 Lethbridge municipal election was held Monday, October 18, 2021, to elect a mayor and eight councillors (at-large), the seven Lethbridge School Division trustees, and five of the Holy Spirit Catholic School Division’s nine trustees (as Ward 2).

Incumbent mayor Chris Spearman, announced in January 2021 that he would not seek re-election. He served 2 terms as mayor—being first elected in 2013—after having sat for several years on the Holy Spirit school board. Of the 8 incumbent councillors, Rob Miyashiro, Joe Mauro, and Jeff Coffman declined to run for re-election. Four incumbent councillors, Mark Campbell, Jeff Carlson, Belinda Crowson, and Ryan Parker stated they would run again, and another incumbent, Blaine Hyggen, announced he would try for the mayoral vacancy left by Spearman's departure.

During the 2017 municipal election, 21,357 of the 78,772 eligible voters turned in a ballot, a voter turnout of 27%.

Results 
Bold indicates elected, and incumbents are marked with an (X).

81,276 eligible voters

28,348 voted

Voter turn-out: 34.88 percent

Mayor

Candidates

Declared 
 Sheldon Joseph Day Chief, former leader at Blood Tribe
Blaine Hyggen, incumbent councillor
Gary Klassen, real estate agent

Bridget Mearns, former councillor and mayoral candidate
Kolton Menzak, MMA fighter
Stephen Mogdan, lawyer

Councillors

Candidates
Top eight candidates are elected at large

Declared 
 Kelti Baird, business owner
Marissa Black, tax professional
Mark Campbell, incumbent
Jeff Carlson, incumbent 
Ben Christensen, business owner
Rufa Doria, immigration consultant
Bill Ginther, Soup Kitchen executive director
Dale Leier, retired
Darcy Logan, not-for-profit administrator
Shelby MacLeod, 
Bernard Mbonihankuye
John Middleton-Hope, former police chief
Nick Paladino, municipal development consultant
Ryan Parker, incumbent
Jenn Prosser, not-for-profit administrator
Chris Rowley, community activist
Kyle Sargeant, business owner
Jenn Schmidt-Rempel, business owner
Suketu Shah, financial advisor
Tim Vanderbeek,
Bradley Whalen, business owner
Davey Wiggers
Ryan Wolfe, mortgage professional
Boyd Thomas, not-for-profit director

Plebiscite 
Lethbridge's 2021 municipal election will include two plebiscite questions – one on establishing a ward system and one to construct a third river crossing over the Oldman River.

References

See also 
2021 Alberta municipal elections
2021 Calgary municipal election
2021 Edmonton municipal election

2021 Alberta municipal elections
Municipal elections in Lethbridge